In theoretical physics, the Jordan map, often also called the Jordan–Schwinger map is a map from matrices  to bilinear expressions of quantum oscillators which expedites computation of  representations of Lie algebras occurring in physics.  It was introduced by Pascual Jordan in 1935 and was utilized by Julian Schwinger in 1952 to re-work out the theory of quantum angular momentum efficiently, given that map’s ease of organizing the (symmetric) representations of  su(2) in Fock space.

The map utilizes several creation and annihilation operators  
The commutation relations of creation and annihilation operators in a multiple-boson system are,
 
 

These operators change the eigenvalues of the number operator,
 ,
by one, as for multidimensional  quantum  harmonic oscillators.

The Jordan map from a set of matrices  to Fock space bilinear operators ,
  
is clearly a Lie algebra isomorphism, i.e. the operators  satisfy the same commutation relations as  the matrices .

The example of angular momentum
For example, the image of the Pauli matrices of SU(2) in this map, 

for two-vector a†s, and as satisfy the same commutation relations of SU(2) as well, and moreover, by reliance on the completeness relation for Pauli matrices, 

This is the starting point of Schwinger’s treatment of the theory of quantum angular momentum, predicated on the action of these operators on Fock states built of arbitrary higher powers of such operators. For instance, acting on an (unnormalized) Fock eigenstate, 
 
while 
 

Fermions
Antisymmetric representations of Lie algebras can further be accommodated by use of the fermionic operators  
For fermions, the commutator is replaced by the anticommutator ,
 
 
Therefore, exchanging disjoint (i.e. ) operators in a product of creation of annihilation operators will reverse the sign in fermion systems, but not in boson systems. This formalism has been used by A. A. Abrikosov in the theory of the Kondo effect to represent the localized spin-1/2, and is called Abrikosov fermions in the solid-state physics literature.

See also
 Borel-Weil-Bott Theorem
 Current algebra
 Angular momentum operator
 Klein transformation
 Bogoliubov transformation
 Holstein–Primakoff transformation
 Jordan–Wigner transformation
Clebsch–Gordan coefficients for SU(3)#Symmetry group of the 3D oscillator Hamiltonian operator

References

Representation theory of Lie algebras
Mathematical physics
Theoretical physics